The women's team sprint competition at the 2020  UEC European Track Championships was held on 11 November 2020.

Results

Qualifying
All teams advanced to the first round.

First round
First round heats were held as follows:
Heat 1: 2nd v 3rd fastest
Heat 2: 1st v 4th fastest

The winners of each heat proceeded to the gold medal race. The remaining two teams proceeded to the bronze medal race.

Finals

References

Women's team sprint
European Track Championships – Women's team sprint